Hanna Maiya Ibarra  (born 13 June 1989) is a Filipino women's international footballer who plays as a goalkeeper. She is a member of the Philippines women's national football team. She was part of the team at the 2015 AFF Women's Championship. On club level she played for Green Archers United in Philippines.

Ibarra later founded Hiraya F.C. and participated as a player for the club in the inaugural season of the PFF Women's League.

References

1989 births
Living people
Filipino women's footballers
Philippines women's international footballers
Place of birth missing (living people)
Women's association football goalkeepers